David Bolt is the founding editor-in-chief of the Journal of Literary and Cultural Disability Studies and the director of the Centre for Culture & Disability Studies at Liverpool Hope University, where he is also Professor of Disability Studies and Interdisciplinarity.

Academic work 

Bolt joined Liverpool Hope University in August 2009 as a lecturer in disability studies. He is Editor-in-Chief of the Journal of Literary and Cultural Disability Studies, founder of the International Network of Literary & Cultural Disability Scholars, and was the first Honorary Research Fellow in the Centre for Disability Research at Lancaster University.

His published works include:

Monographs 

The Metanarrative of Blindness: A Re-reading of Twentieth-Century Anglophone Writing (The University of Michigan Press, 2014).
Cultural Disability Studies in Education: Interdisciplinary Navigations of the Normative Divide.  (Routledge, 2019)

Edited Collections 
The Madwoman and the Blindman: Jane Eyre, Discourse, Disability Eds. David Bolt, Julia Miele Rodas, & Elizabeth J. Donaldson (Ohio State University Press, 2012)
Changing Social Attitudes Toward Disability Ed. David Bolt (Routledge, 2014 )
Disability, Avoidance and the Academy: Challenging Resistance Eds. David Bolt & Claire Penketh (Routledge, 2016)
Metanarratives of Disability: Culture, Assumed Authority, and the Normative Social Order Ed. David Bolt (Routledge, 2021)
Finding Blindness: International Constructions and Deconstructions Ed. David Bolt (Routledge, 2022)

Book Series 
Literary Disability Studies Book Series Eds. David Bolt, Elizabeth J. Donaldson, & Julia Melie Rodas (Palgrave Macmillan/Springer Publishing)
 The Literary and Linguistic Construction of Obsessive-Compulsive Disorder: No Ordinary Doubt. Patricia Friedrich, 2015, New York: Palgrave Macmillan/Springer
 Disability in Comic Books and Graphic Narratives. Eds. Chris Foss, Jonathan W. Gray, & Zach Whalen, 2016, New York: Palgrave Macmillan/Springer
 Disabling Romanticism: Body, Mind, and Text. Ed. Michael Bradshaw, 2016, New York: Palgrave Macmillan/Springer
 Reviewing Blindness in French Fiction, 1789-2013. Hannah Thompson, 2017, New York: Palgrave Macmillan/Springer
 Tuberculosis and Disabled Identity in Nineteenth Century Literature: Invalid Lives. Alex Tankard, 2018, New York: Palgrave Macmillan/Springer
 Literatures of Madness: Disability Studies and Mental Health. Ed. Elizabeth J. Donaldson, 2018, New York: Palgrave Macmillan/Springer
 Dissembling Disability in Early Modern English Drama. Lindsey Row-Heyveld, 2018, New York: Palgrave Macmillan/Springer
 Performing Disability in Early Modern English Drama. Ed. Leslie C. Dunn, 2020, New York: Palgrave Macmillan/Springer
 Disability and Life Writing in Post-Independence Ireland. Elizabeth Grubgeld, 2020, New York: Palgrave Macmillan/Springer
 Amputation in Literature and Film: Artificial Limbs, Prosthetic Relations and the Semiotics of "Loss" Eds. Erik Grayson and Maren Scheurer, 2021, New York: Palgrave Macmillan/Springer
 Dramatizing Blindness: Disability Studies as Critical Creative Narrative. Devon Healey, 2021, New York: Palgrave Macmillan/Springer
 Autonomist Narratives of Disability in Modern Scottish Writing: Crip Enchantments Arianna Introna, 2022, New York: Palgrave Macmillan/Springer

A Cultural History of Disability. General Eds. David Bolt, & Robert McRuer (Bloomsbury, 2019)
 A Cultural History of Disability in Antiquity, Volume 1. Ed. Christian Laes, 2020, London: Bloomsbury Academic
 A Cultural History of Disability in the Middle Ages, Volume 2. Eds. Jonathan Hsy, Tory V. Pearman & Joshua R. Eyler, 2020, London: Bloomsbury Academic
 A Cultural History of Disability in the Renaissance, Volume 3. Eds. Susan Anderson & Liam Haydon, 2020, London: Bloomsbury Academic
 A Cultural History of Disability in the Long Eighteenth Century, Volume 4. Eds. D. Christopher Gabbard & Susannah B. Mintz, 2020, London: Bloomsbury Academic
 A Cultural History of Disability in the Long Nineteenth Century, Volume 5. Eds. Joyce L. Huff & Martha Stoddard Holmes, 2020, London: Bloomsbury Academic
 A Cultural History of Disability in the Modern Age, Volume 6. Eds. David T. Mitchell & Sharon L. Snyder, 2020, London: Bloomsbury Academic

Autocritical Disability Studies Book Series Ed. David Bolt (Routledge)
 Metanarratives of Disability: Culture, Assumed Authority and the Normative Social Order Ed. David Bolt, 2021 Abingdon: Routledge
 Finding Blindness: International Constructions and Deconstructions Ed. David Bolt, 2022 Abingdon: Routledge
 Midgetism: The Exploitation and Discrimination of People with Dwarfism Erin Pritchard, 2023 Abingdon: Routledge

Centre for Culture & Disability Studies 

Bolt is the director of the Centre for Culture & Disability Studies (CCDS; Liverpool Hope University). The work of the CCDS is fundamentally concerned with social justice: with challenging and changing the inequalities and prejudices that people who are disabled face on a daily basis.

Key areas of interest include:

The analysis of representations of disability in all forms of cultural production (e.g., literature, film, art, advertising, television, etc.), and how these shape wider public understandings of disability.
Curricular reform at all levels of education.

CCDS YouTube Channel

The CCDS events are internationally recognised for bringing together a mix of Early Career Researchers and some of the most eminent professors in the field. The seminars are often filmed. People can now subscribe to this channel to access various videos.

Creative Writing

In the early 21st century Bolt was involved in Creative Writing as a tutor at Newcastle Under Lyme College and as a writer of poetry and short stories. His short stories appeared in Breath and Shadow. Short stories include, "Spangles", "The Currency of Beauty", and "The Silent Treatment". "The Silent Treatment" was anthologized in the book 'Dozen: The Best of Breath and Shadow'.

Music

In the early to mid 1980s Bolt was singer and songwriter in the pop-rock group Life (first known as Private Life). At the group’s peak Bolt worked with drummer Roy Walker, bassist Steven Burns, keyboard player Paul Gribbin, and guitarist Paul Beal. Life recorded and rehearsed at the Gaolhouse Studio in Newcastle-under-Lyme and played at large venues such as Bingley Hall in Stafford and the King’s Hall in Stoke-on-Trent.  In the mid 1980s the group recorded its vinyl release ‘Take Me Higher Now’ and ‘You’re Still Running’ at Swallow Studios in Cheshire. Bolt continued writing and recording in the Secret Room Recording Studio until the mid 1990s.

References

External links 
 Centre for Culture & Disability Studies
 Disability Archive UK
 David Bolt's Music

Living people
Alumni of Staffordshire University
Academics of Liverpool Hope University
Year of birth missing (living people)